Ramsey Kanaan is a Lebanese-Scottish publisher and distributor of anarchist literature. In 1987, he founded AK Press (named after his mother, Ann Kanaan), and later in 2007, of the anarchist publisher PM Press, where he remains the publisher.

Kanaan is one of the founders of the Bay Area Anarchist Book Fair and is a member of Bound Together Books in San Francisco, a collectively run anarchist bookstore.

In the 1980s he was the singer of the Scottish anarcho-punk band Political Asylum.

References

Further reading 

 
 
 
 Prelinger, Megan Shaw. "An Interview with Ramsey Kanaan of AK Press." The Anti-Capitalism Reader: Imagining a Geography of Opposition Ed. Joel Schalit. Akashic Books, 2002.
 "Interview with Ramsey Kanaan on San Francisco Anarchist Book Fair"
 Solnit, David. "Poll Tax RebellionHow One Small Scottish Anarchist Group Toppled the Thatcher Government: An Interview by David Solnit with Ramsey Kanaan." Globalize Liberation: How to Uproot the System and Build a Better World Ed. David Solnit. City Lights Publishers, 2003.
 
 "Interview with Ramsey Kanaan on A Radical Guide"  February 14, 2018

Living people
American anarchists
Scottish anarchists
20th-century Scottish male singers
British people of Lebanese descent
Scottish publishers (people)
Scottish activists
Year of birth missing (living people)
Place of birth missing (living people)
Musicians from Oakland, California